NASA's Origins program is a decades-long study addressing the origins of the universe, various astronomical bodies, and life. The Origins program was started in the 1990s.

So far, it consists of the following missions:
 ground-based
 Keck telescopes*
 Large Binocular Telescope Interferometer*
 Keck Interferometer*
 airborne
 Stratospheric Observatory for Infrared Astronomy (SOFIA)*
 space based
 Hubble Space Telescope (HST)*
 Far Ultraviolet Spectroscopic Explorer (FUSE) - completed
 Spitzer Space Telescope (SST) - completed
 Kepler Space Observatory - completed
 Space Interferometry Mission (SIM) - cancelled
 Terrestrial Planet Finder (TPF) - cancelled
 James Webb Space Telescope (JWST)*
 Single Aperture Far Infrared Observatory (SAFIR)
 Large UV/Optical Telescope
 Life Finder
 Planet Imager

Missions marked with * are operational.

References

External links
Origins Program - NASA Jet Propulsion Laboratory

NASA programs